A58 or A-58 may refer to :
 A58 road, a road connecting Prescot and Wetherby in England
 Autostrada A58, a bypass of Milano, Italy
 A58 motorway (Netherlands), a road connecting Eindhoven and Breda
 A-58 highway (Spain), a proposed road to connect Trujillo and the A5 and A66 in Spain
 One of the Encyclopaedia of Chess Openings codes for the Benko Gambit in chess